Jessup or Jessups Station is an unincorporated community in Florida Township, Parke County, in the U.S. state of Indiana.

History
A post office was established at Jessup in 1867, and remained in operation until 1948. The community was named for one Mr. Jessup, an early settler and old resident of the community.

Geography

References

Unincorporated communities in Indiana
Unincorporated communities in Parke County, Indiana